Bear Wallow or Bearwallow may refer to:
Bear Wallow, Kentucky (disambiguation), three towns in Kentucky
Bearwallow, North Carolina, an unincorporated community
Bear Wallow Wilderness
Bearwallow Creek
Bearwallow Mountain Lookout Cabins and Shed

See also
Wallowing in animals